Ila al-Amam ("Forward!" in Arabic) may refer to:
 Ila al-Amam (Iraq). A splinter group of the Iraqi Communist Party in 1942
 Ila al-Amam (Morocco). A Moroccan Marxist movement created in 1970 by Abraham Serfaty